Michal Irani is a professor in the Department of Computer Science and Applied Mathematics at the Weizmann Institute of Science, Israel.

Education 
Irani received her Ph.D. degree in computer science from the Hebrew University of Jerusalem. Subsequently, she was a member of the Vision Technologies Laboratory at the Sarnoff Research Center (Princeton).

Research 
Irani's research is in the area of computer vision, image processing, and artificial intelligence. In particular, she has done work on understanding the internal statistics of natural images and videos, the space-time analysis of videos, and on visual inference by composition.

Selected awards 
 2020 Rothschild Prize in Mathematics/Computer Sciences and Engineering
 2017 Helmholtz Prize for the paper "Actions as space-time shapes"
 2016 Maria Petrou Prize (awarded by the International Association in Pattern Recognition) for outstanding contributions to the fields of Computer Vision and Pattern Recognition
 2003 Morris L. Levinson Prize in Mathematics 
 2000, 2002 ECCV Best Paper Awards

References 

Computer vision researchers
Israeli women academics
Academic staff of Weizmann Institute of Science
Hebrew University of Jerusalem School of Computer Science & Engineering alumni
Year of birth missing (living people)
Living people